The ocellated forest tree frog (Leptopelis ocellatus) is a species of frog in the family Arthroleptidae found in Cameroon, the  Republic of the Congo, the Democratic Republic of the Congo, Equatorial Guinea, and Gabon, and possibly Angola and the Central African Republic.
Its natural habitats are subtropical or tropical moist lowland forest, swamps, and heavily degraded former forests.
It is threatened by habitat loss.

References

Leptopelis
Taxonomy articles created by Polbot
Amphibians described in 1902